Umgababa is a rural community area with a large marketplace for tourists in KwaZulu-Natal, South Africa. It forms part of eThekwini.

Etymology
The river valley's name uMgababa is of Zulu origin meaning the place of jealousy, its origin from a tribal feud.

Geography
The Umgababa River (originally "Umkababa", which means "my father's wife") enters the ocean at Umgababa. Its origin is at an elevation of 51 meters above sea level. Umgababa River is also known as Umtateni River. The name is derived from an ancient Zulu Chief Luthuli who used to live in the valley. The Chief of Umgababa is Phathisizwe Philbert Luthuli.

Economy

Agriculture
Litchis are produced in this region.

Mining
There once was a large titanium mine here but it closed due to serious sea pollution.

Culture and contemporary life

Tourism
In a few years it has grown from a rural area into a tourist site. The area now hosts the biggest annual year-end event consisting of many popular South African musicians on New Year's Eve. Currently there are plans to build amphitheatres and permanent performance stages.

References

Populated places in eThekwini Metropolitan Municipality
KwaZulu-Natal South Coast